Mapsidius charpentierii is a moth of the family Scythrididae. It was first described by Otto Herman Swezey in 1932. It is endemic to the Hawaiian island of Oahu.

It is similar to Mapsidius auspicata, but is larger and the black marks on the forewings are more distinct and angulated.

The larvae feed on Charpentiera obovata.

The cocoon is elongate spindle shaped, densely made of white silk, placed on underside of leaf and beneath a thin lacework of silk which has several large circular meshes. This is similar to the way the cocoon of Mapsidius quadridentata is constructed, whereas the cocoon of M. auspicata is broad spindle shaped beneath a closely woven layer of white silk. The pupa is about 10 mm and dark brown.

References

External links

Scythrididae
Endemic moths of Hawaii